Nadeo (pronounced NĂ-dā-yō) is a French video game developer founded in 2000. The studio is best known for creating the racing game series TrackMania. Other games developed by Nadeo include the Virtual Skipper series and ShootMania. Nadeo's latest game was TrackMania (2020), which was released on July 1, 2020. Since 2009, Nadeo has been a subsidiary of Ubisoft.

History 
Nadeo was founded in 2000 in Paris, France, by Florent Castelnérac and Pascal Hérold. Their first game was Virtual Skipper 2, released in 2002. In 2003, Nadeo released the first entry in the TrackMania series, which received "mixed or average reviews" from critics. TrackMania reached over 700,000 unique players each month, and had 10 million registered players by 2009. In 2009, Nadeo was acquired by Ubisoft for an undisclosed sum. 

In September 2020, CEO Florent Castelnérac was accused of abusive behavior and bullying towards his staff.

Games developed

References 

Video game development companies
French companies established in 2000
Ubisoft divisions and subsidiaries
Companies based in Paris